This is a list of companies based in Gurgaon. Gurgaon had a population of 876,969. Witnessing rapid urbanisation, Gurgaon has become a leading financial and industrial hub with the highest per capita income in India.

Companies based in Delhi 

 Amartex
 Amdocs
 Apollo Tyres
 Artemis Hospital
 Aristocrat Leisure
 Aviva India
 Ballarpur Industries
 Bharti Airtel
 Blinkit
 Ciena
 Comviva
 Colt Technology Services
 Delhivery
 DLF
 Dunzo
 Eicher Motors
 English Indian Clays Ltd(EICL)
 Employees State Insurance Corporation
 FabFurnish
 FabHotels
 Freecharge
 Fullerton Securities
 Fortis Healthcare
 Goibibo
 Hero MotoCorp
 Housing.com
 Hughes Systique Corporation
 Jabong.com
 JBM Group(Jay Bharat Maruti Ltd.)
 Jaquar
 Jindal Steel and Power
 JSL Limited
 Lenskart
 Limeroad
 Hyundai Motor India
 ICRA Limited
 IL&FS Technologies Limited
 Indian Farmers Fertiliser Cooperative
 IndiGo
 Indus Towers
 Indiabulls
 IYogi
 Lemon Tree Hotels
 Lybrate
 MakeMyTrip
 Mavenir
 MullenLowe Lintas Group
 Mettl
 Medanta
 Micromax Informatics
 MobiKwik
 NIIT
 NTT Data
 Oxigen Services
 Oyo Rooms
 Paper Boat
 Paras Healthcare
 Policybazaar
 Power Grid Corporation of India
 Pristyn Care
 Punj Lloyd
 PVR Cinemas
 Raheja Developers
 RailTel
 REC Limited
 ReNew Power
 Revv Cars
  RITES
 Ranbaxy Laboratories
 Roposo
 Mankind Pharma
 Max Life Insurance
 Max Healthcare
 Satya Paul
 Snapdeal
 SBI Cards
 SIX5SIX
 Swiggy
 ShopClues
 Shuttl
 SpiceJet
 SRF Limited
 Stryker
 Sterlite Technologies
 Su-Kam Power Systems
 Tata 1mg
 Tex Corp
 Tejas Networks
 Tower Research
 Times Internet
 Transport Corporation of India
 Verint Systems
 Xerox India
 Ibibo
 Info Edge
 ixigo
 Yatra
 Yebhi
 Zomato
 ZS Associates

See also

 List of companies based in Hyderabad

References

 01
Gurgaon
companies based in Gurgaon
Gurgaon